Cale Dodds is an American country music artist and songwriter who is currently signed to Spirit Music Group.

Musical career 
Cale Dodds has been writing songs since the age of 12. in high school, he formed a punk band called Lakeside. At the age of 22, after attending Columbus State University, Dodds made the move from Columbus, GA to Nashville, TN to pursue his career in music. In 2014, Cale released his first EP titled “Wild and Wreckless”—a five-song project recorded at Ocean Way Studio with Kyle Jacobs and Matt McClure. In 2015, Dodds received a cut from A Thousand Horses for his song “Drunk Dial,” which reached number 23 on Billboards's Country Airplay Chart; and in 2016, Warner/Chappell Music signed Dodds to a worldwide publishing agreement. In March 2016, Dodds independently released his second project, "People Watching - EP", produced by Corey Crowder and Zach Abend. Since the release, his songs "People Watching" and "Lying" have been streamed over 5 million times, and “Acting Our Age,” was selected for the EA Sports Madden ‘17 soundtrack which also featured artists such as Blake Shelton and Brantley Gilbert.

Cale has also been tour support for artists like Sam Hunt, Brett Eldredge, and Billy Currington

In January 2017, Cale Dodds joined Warner Music Nashville. Later that year, in September, Dodds released his first major label "double"—a two-sided single—featuring "All Over" and "Lying." The second double followed in November with "Out Of My System" and "People Watching," and the third in January 2018 with Cale's radio single "Take You Back" and "Like We Do."

"Take You Back" arrived to country music radio in March, but prior to hitting the airwaves, Rolling Stone had already named Cale Dodds one of their November 2017 "New Country Artists You Need To Know." CMT Listen Up revealed him as one of their "18 for 2018" class members—a year-long campaign that spotlights "country music's most promising newcomers." Billboard and Rolling Stone both named Dodd's 2018 CMA Fest performance as one of the best things they saw from the four-day music festival.

In early October 2018, Cale Dodds shared new music with a studio and acoustic version of his song, "What We Gonna Do About It;" and followed with another two versions of "Where I Get It From" which was released in November of that same year.

Most recently, in March 2019, Dodds released his current single "I Like Where This Is Going"—a song written with hit writers Nicolle Galyon and Busbee about "anticipation" and seeing "the uncertainty of what’s going to happen, while having faith that it’s going to unfold in the right way."

Discography

Extended plays

Singles

Music videos

Songwriter Features

Television work

References

External links 
 Official website

1988 births
American country singer-songwriters
Living people
People from Columbus, Georgia
Columbus State University alumni
Country musicians from Georgia (U.S. state)
Singer-songwriters from Georgia (U.S. state)